John Andrews (1736–1809) was a historical writer and pamphleteer.

Works
Andrews produced numerous works. Among these are:

 History of the Revolutions of Denmark, etc., 1774.
 History of War with America, France, Spain, and Holland, commencing in 1775 and ending in 1783, four vols., London, 1785–86.
 Letters to his Excellency the Count de Welderen on the present Situation of Affairs between Great Britain and the United Provinces, London, 1781 (of which a Dutch translation appeared in the same year at Amsterdam).
 Letters to a Young Gentleman on his setting out for France, containing a survey of Paris and a review of French literature, 1784.
Historical Review of the Moral, Religious, Literary, and Political Character of the English Nation, 1806.

The Gentleman's Magazine for February 1809 has the following obituary announcement: "At his house at Kennington, Surrey, in his seventy-third year, Dr. John Andrews, a gentleman well known in the literary world. By his death the nation is deprived of an able historian, a profound scholar and politician, and a man ever ready to take up his pen in his country's cause".

Notes

References

1736 births
1809 deaths
18th-century English people
18th-century English non-fiction writers
18th-century English male writers
18th-century English writers
People from Kennington
19th-century English non-fiction writers
English pamphleteers
19th-century English male writers